Havoline is a motor oil brand currently commercialized by Chevron. The brand had been previously owned by Texaco (since 1931), until the company was acquired by Chevron in 2001.

History 

First introduced in 1904, the Havoline motor oil brand was named by Havemeyer Oil Company of New York.
In 1906 the Havoline Oil Company separated from the Havemeyer Oil Company. In May 1909, It was bought by the Indian Refining Company, and registered as an official product of the company but kept the logo. By 1910, the Indian Refining Company already had the Havoline oil manufactured. To boost sales & advertise the product they offered to fuel the first plane to fly coast to Coast. Over 300 auto makers wanted it. In 1915 due to over production they had to halt operations. In 1931 it once again changed hands when the Texas Oil company (now Texaco) bought the Indian Refining Company. In 1946 a breakthrough in technology improved Havoline.

In 1962 they changed the logo, replacing the old Indian logo. That same year new products were introduced, Havoline 10W-30, and Havoline Singlegrade. In 1968 'Improved Havoline & All Temperature Havoline' were introduced, followed by Havoline Super-Premium All Temperature Motor Oil in 1971. In 1979 Texaco ends the decade with a new product called Havoline Supreme 10W-40, which superseded Havoline Super-Premium. In 1984 a major breakthrough came with the SAW 20W-50 to keep up with growing demand.

In 1991 they launched the Formula 3, which became popular all over the world. In 2001 a new logo and package design came out for the whole line of products.

In 2001, Texaco merged with Chevron but the Havoline brand name has been retained for all Texaco motor oils and other lubricating products along with anti-freezes.

The Havoline brand now carries the Chevron logo.

Sponsorships
In 1972, Havoline sponsored Emerson Fittipaldi, who became a world champion in Formula One. In 1978, they sponsored Janet Guthrie, a CART and NASCAR driver.

From 1987 to 2002, Havoline sponsored the Robert Yates Racing #28 car in the NASCAR Cup Series. Also, Havoline sponsored Newman/Haas Racing from 1989 to 2002, which featured notable drivers such as Mario Andretti, Michael Andretti, Nigel Mansell, Christian Fittipaldi, and Cristiano da Matta. Havoline's recent sponsorship was with Juan Pablo Montoya in the #42 Dodge for Chip Ganassi Racing with Felix Sabates. At the end of the 2008 NASCAR season, Texaco / Havoline officially ended their sponsorship with NASCAR and Chip Ganassi Racing.  This brings to a close a 20+-year relationship with the sport.

After ending its sponsorship with NASCAR, Havoline became a sponsor of the Atlantic Coast Conference.

Havoline returned as a NASCAR sponsor with a 3 race deal with ThorSport Racing, for Ben Rhodes, driver of the 99 truck.

Varieties
Havoline Motor Oils
Havoline High-Mileage Protection Motor Oils
Havoline Synthetic Motor Oils
Havoline Synthetic Blend Motor Oil
Texaco Ursa Super Plus Motor Oils
Texaco Ursa Extra Duty Motor Oils
Havoline Two-Cycle Engine Oil

References

External links
 
  Notes on the history of Indian Refining Company

Texaco
Motor oils
Products introduced in 1904